Suran (also Romanized as Sūrān) is a village in Kuhsangi Rural District, Miyan Velayat District, Taybad County, Razavi Khorasan Province, Iran. At the 2006 census, its population was 1,090, in 242 families.

References 

Populated places in Taybad County